Tibor Polakovič (May 25, 1935 – November 23, 2002) was a Czechoslovak sprint canoer who competed in the early 1960s. He finished fifth in the C-1 1000 m event at the 1960 Summer Olympics in Rome.

References
Tibor Polakovič's profile at Sports Reference.com

1935 births
2002 deaths
Canoeists at the 1960 Summer Olympics
Czechoslovak male canoeists
Olympic canoeists of Czechoslovakia